The Port of Tilbury is a port on the River Thames at Tilbury in Essex, England. It is the principal port for London, as well as being the main United Kingdom port for handling the importation of paper. There are extensive facilities for containers, grain, and other bulk cargoes. There are also facilities for the importation of cars. It forms part of the wider Port of London.

Geography
The loop is part of the Thames lower reaches: within the meander was a huge area of marshland. Gravesend on the opposite shore had long been a port of entry for shipping, all of which had used the river itself for loading and unloading of cargo and passengers. There was also a naval dockyard at Northfleet at the mouth of the Ebbsfleet River. The new deepwater docks were an extension of all that maritime activity. The original docks consisted of a tidal basin on Gravesend Reach opposite Northfleet, connected by a lock to a main dock with three side branches named East, Central and West Branch docks. Between the tidal basin and Main Dock were two dry docks.

History

Construction
The original docks of London, all built close to the City, were opened in stages by what was to become the East and West India Docks Company (E&WIDC) at the beginning of the 19th century. With the coming of the railways and increasing ship size, proximity to the centre of London became less important than access to deep water, unrestricted sites and reduction in time spent travelling up the winding Thames. The company had long been in competition with its rival, the London and St Katherine Dock Company (L&StKDC). The opening of the Royal Albert Dock by the L&StKDC, with its deepwater quayage, in 1880 had given access to the Thames at Gallions Reach,  by river below London Bridge and downstream of the then principal London docks. The E&WIDC were forced to retaliate.

In July 1882, an Act of Parliament allowed the latter to construct the docks at Tilbury. The construction encountered difficulties when the contractors, Kirk & Randell unexpectedly encountered blue clay and claimed extra costs. The Company had them ejected from the site in 1884, triggering expensive legal action. For a while the East & West India Company continued construction with their own workers until the firm of Lucas and Aird was engaged to complete the work. The first vessel entered the docks on 17 April 1886. This was the Glenfruin carrying the official party for the opening ceremony. The opening of the dock took place at the beginning of the steamship era, and its location soon proved to be advantageous.

Docks expansion
In 1909 Tilbury, along with the upstream docks, became part of the newly established Port of London Authority (PLA).

In 1921, and again in 1929, the PLA carried out major improvements. These works were carried out by Sir Robert McAlpine.

During the 1960s, at the time when the upstream docks were closing, the PLA further extended the Tilbury dock facilities. The tidal basin was closed and eventually filled in. In 1969 a £6 million riverside grain terminal on Northfleet Hope was brought into use.

The PLA funded a new £30 million container port which opened in 1967. Labour issues prevented full service from starting until April 1970, although United States Lines reached an agreement with the union to begin service in 1968.

Near the Dockmaster's office, on New Lock, is a memorial to Captain Peter de Neumann, GM, who was killed there in an accident on 16 September 1972. In 1978, a deep water riverside berth was opened for large container ships on reclaimed land at Northfleet Hope.

In 1992 the port was privatised and became part of the Forth Ports organisation, the PLA retaining the role of managing the tidal Thames.

Rolf Harris visited the Docks in 2004 during a TV episode of Rolf on Art, when he recreated J. M. W. Turner's famous painting The Fighting Temeraire.

On 25 January 2012 Otter Ports Holdings Ltd, owner of Forth Ports, acquired from DP World Limited ("DP World") and Associated British Ports Ltd ("AB Ports") the 67% ownership of Tilbury Container Services Ltd ("TCS") not already owned by Forth Ports in a cash transaction. Forth Ports had been a one third shareholder in TCS since 1998 along with partners DP World and AB Ports. TCS is located within the Port of Tilbury, which is wholly owned by Forth Ports.

In October 2019, 39 people were found dead in a truck at nearby Grays. The truck was moved to the Port of Tilbury the next day, so that more investigations could be undertaken. After that, the bodies were moved to Broomfield Hospital.

Port of Tilbury recently announced a joint development with Tarmac, a partnership which will see the UK's largest construction materials aggregates terminal (CMAT) built on a 152-acre site. The joint development of the CMAT is expected to see most operations established by the end of 2020.

London Cruise Terminal

One of the shipping lines using the docks was the P&O. Tilbury became the only port in the PLA to serve ocean liners, when, in 1916, it opened berths specifically for the P&O within the dock complex. With the need for expanded facilities, a large new passenger landing stage was constructed in the Thames jointly by the PLA and the London Midland and Scottish Railway, with rail connections. It was opened in May 1930 by Ramsay MacDonald.

Tilbury operated as London's passenger liner passenger terminal until the 1960s. For many people Tilbury was their point of emigration to Australia under an assisted passage scheme established and operated by the Australian Government. The 'Ten Pound Poms' as they were known in Australia, embarked on to ships such as RMS Mooltan and set off for a new life.

The passenger landing stage was reopened by the Port of Tilbury group, as the London Cruise Terminal in 1995. The historic passenger terminal building has been rebuilt and refurbished over the subsequent years and is now called the "London International Cruise Terminal". The old station building (no longer served by a railway connection) has been refurbished to house a new luggage retrieval hall.

Other port activities
The Port of Tilbury Police, among the oldest of such forces in the UK, are responsible for the security of the Port.

The port is also a base of operations of Thurrock Sea Cadets, who operate out of TS Iveston (a Coniston class former minesweeper).

Seafarers welfare charity, Apostleship of the Sea, which provides practical and pastoral support to seafarers, has a port chaplain based at the port.

Tilbury Docks in film
The Docks were used as the setting of John Wayne's smuggler-busting operation in Brannigan (1975). The Docks stood in for Venetian waterways during the boat-chase scene in Indiana Jones and the Last Crusade (1989).

A scene from the Jude Law film Alfie (2004) was filmed there;  as were scenes from Batman Begins (2005). In Paddington (2014), the scene where Paddington arrives on a boat was filmed at the Port of Tilbury.

References

Sources

External links

 Newsreel 1933, Locomotive been shipped from Tilbury Docks

Ports and harbours of Essex
Ports and harbours of the Thames Estuary
Port of Tilbury
Transport in Thurrock
Port of London
Port